Reine (as known Queen in English) is a song of the French rapper Dadju from the album Gentleman 2.0 was recorded in 2017 and released on May 5, 2017 as a single.

Music video 

The music video was released on YouTube on May 5, 2017; as of April 2020 the video combined 236 million views.

Charts

Certifications

References 

2017 songs
2018 singles
French songs